The Royal Belgian Genealogical and Heraldic Office (French: Association Royale Office Généalogique et Héraldique de Belgique or OGHB) is a private genealogical and heraldic society in Belgium. It was founded in 1942 as an ASBL and has over a thousand members interested in genealogy and heraldry. While it publishes exclusively in the French language, it covers all regions of Belgium.

Its main purpose is the historical study of families without distinction of social class or profession as well as the auxiliary sciences of history, such as genealogy and heraldry.

The OGHB benefits from royal patronage and government subsidies and is thus considered as having a somewhat greater status than a purely private society.

It used to record the arms of persons and families before this task was taken over by the Council of Heraldry and Vexillology for the French Community and the Flemish Heraldic Council for the Flemish Community.

Publications 
The association publishes a number of publications:

 Le Parchemin: a bimonthly review with table and index. 
Le Héraut: quarterly link sheet with practical information and announcements.
Les Recueils: works, each issue of which includes a major study (most often genealogical). Example: the living heraldic armorial.

Board of directors

See also 

Family history society
Belgian heraldry
Council of Heraldry and Vexillology
 Flemish Heraldic Council
Heraldry societies
Association Royale des Descendants des Lignages de Bruxelles

References 

Genealogy publications
Literature on heraldry